Allergies in children are those causes, pathophysiology, treatments, management, practices and control of allergies that develop in children.  Up to 40 percent of children suffer from allergic rhinitis. And children are more likely to develop allergies if one or both parents have allergies. Allergies differ between adults and children. Part of the reason for the difference is that the respiratory system in children is smaller. The bronchi and bronchioles are narrower so even a slight decrease in diameter of these airways can have serious consequences. Many children outgrow their allergies.

The incidence of childhood allergies has increased in the past 50 years.

Signs and symptoms
The signs and symptoms of allergies in a child are:
 Chronic symptoms resembling the cold that last more than a week or two
 Cold-like symptoms that appear during the same time each year
 Repeated difficulty breathing, wheezing and breathing
 Cold-like symptoms that happen at night
 Cold-like symptoms that happen during exercise
 Chronic rashes or patches of skin that are dry, itchy, look like scales
 Cold-like symptoms that appear after eating a certain food
 Hives
 Swelling of face, arms or legs
 Gagging, coughing or wheezing, vomiting or significant abdominal pain
 Itching or tingling sensations in the mouth, throat or ears

Cause

Each home contains possible allergens that can develop into allergies after exposure to:
 Dust mites
 Dogs and cats
 Other furry pets
 Cockroaches
 Mice and rats
 Plants
 Indoor smoking
 Mold

Vitamin D deficiency at the time of birth and exposure to egg white, milk, peanut, walnut, soy, shrimp, cod fish, and wheat makes a child more susceptible to allergies. Soy-based infant formula is associated with allergies in infants. Though, in recent years they have been becoming more common in children ages 4 and older.

Pathophysiology

A child's allergy is an immune system reaction. The child is reacting to a specific substance, or allergen. The immune system of a child responds to the invading allergen by releasing histamine and other chemicals that typically trigger symptoms in the nose, lungs, throat, sinuses, ears, eyes, skin, or stomach lining. In some children, allergies can also trigger symptoms of asthma—a disease that causes wheezing or difficulty breathing. If a child has allergies and asthma, controlling the allergies is important because the lack of treatment may make the allergies worse. Compounds such as phthalates  are associated with asthma in children. Asthma in children is associated with exposure to indoor allergens. in early childhood may prevent the development of asthma, but exposure at an older age may provoke bronchoconstriction. Use of antibiotics in early life has been linked to the development of asthma. Exposure to indoor volatile organic compounds may be a trigger for asthma; formaldehyde exposure, for example, has a positive association.

Diagnosis

Testing is available to help identify any environmental or food allergies. Caregivers and clinicians can assess the child for the development of an allergy by noting the presence of signs and symptoms and history of exposure.

Prevention

Avoiding allergens will help prevent symptoms. Allergies that a child has to the family pet can be controlled by removing the animal and finding it a new home. Exterminating cockroaches, mice and rats and a thorough cleaning can reduce symptoms of an allergy in children. Dust mites are attracted to moisture. They consume human skin that has come off and lodged in, furniture, rugs, mattresses, box springs, and pillows. The child's bedding can be covered with allergen-proof covers. Laundering of the child's clothing, bed linens and blankets will also reduce exposure.

Exposure to allergens outside the home can be controlled with the use of air conditioners. Washing the hair, taking a bath or shower before bedtime can be done to remove allergens that have been picked up from outside the home. If grass or grass pollen is an allergen it is sometimes beneficial to remain indoors while grass is being cut or mowed. Children with allergies to grass can avoid playing in the grass to prevent allergic symptoms. Staying out of piled leaves in the fall can help. Pets returning into the home after being outdoors may track in allergens.

Management

For most children, avoiding the triggers is very helpful. If it is not, can try over-the-counter medication such as antihistamines (Benadryl) but it is very important to speak to the Pharmacist first before choosing any of the allergy medications available.  If symptoms persist, take the child to see the doctor for diagnosis and prescription medication (if warranted).

Epidemiology
Up to 5% of infants that are fed cow's milk-based formula will develop an allergy to cow's milk. Over half of cases in children in the United States occur in areas with air quality below EPA standards.

Can childhood allergies go away? 
Yes, some childhood allergies can go away over time. Whether or not a childhood allergy will go away depends on several factors, such as the type of allergy and the severity of symptoms. In general, allergies to milk, eggs, soy, and wheat are more likely to be outgrown than allergies to peanuts, tree nuts, fish, and shellfish.

Studies have shown that up to 80% of children with milk, egg, and soy allergies may outgrow them by the time they reach age 5. However, allergies to peanuts, tree nuts, fish, and shellfish tend to be more persistent and are less likely to be outgrown.

It's important to note that while some children may outgrow their allergies, there is always a risk of the allergy returning later in life. It's also important to work with a healthcare professional to properly diagnose and manage childhood allergies, as some allergic reactions can be severe and life-threatening.

References

Bibliography
 

Food allergies
Pediatrics
Respiratory diseases
Allergology
Asthma
Eczema
Epidemiological study projects